Anti may refer to:

Arts and media
Anti- (record label), an American independent record label
Anti (album), by Rihanna
"Anti" (song), by SOB X RBE
ANTI – Contemporary Art Festival, a yearly international live-art festival held in Kuopio, Finland
Anti EP, an EP by Autechre
Anti, an album by T. Raumschmiere

Science and technology
Antiparticle, a particle with the same mass but opposite charges in particle physics
Anti addition, a type of bonding in organic chemistry
Anti conformation, an arrangement of atoms in alkane stereochemistry
ANTI (computer virus), a classic Mac OS computer virus

Other uses
A false reading of Nemty, the name of the ferryman who carried Isis to Set's island in Egyptian mythology
Áńt’į, or corpse powder, Navajo folkloric substance made from powdered corpses
Anti, an Inca name for the Asháninka people

People
Anti (given name), an Estonian masculine given name
Carlo Anti (1889–1961), Italian archaeologist
Karen Anette Anti (born 1972), Norwegian Sami politician
Michael Anti (sport shooter) (born 1964), American sport shooter
Michael Anti (journalist) (born 1975), Chinese journalist and political blogger

See also

Ante (disambiguation)
Anth (disambiguation)
Antti, a Finnish masculine given name
Opposition (disambiguation)
Opposite (disambiguation)